Valley of Death in Fordon, Bydgoszcz, northern Poland, is a site of Nazi German mass murder committed at the beginning of World War II and a mass grave of 1,200–1,400 Poles and Jews murdered in October and November 1939 by the local German Selbstschutz and the Gestapo. The murders were a part of Intelligenzaktion in Pomerania, a Nazi action aimed at the elimination of the Polish intelligentsia in Reichsgau Danzig-West Prussia, which included the former Pomeranian Voivodeship ("Polish Corridor"). It was part of a larger genocidal action that took place in all German occupied Poland, code-named Operation Tannenberg.

History

Victims, mainly Polish intelligentsia: teachers, priests, office workers, were listed on so called Sonderfahndungsbuch Polen (a list of people destined to be executed, made by Third Reich officials before World War II) and another list made by Gestapo during the war.

The perpetrators were mainly from the new Selbstschutz battalions called the Volksdeutscher Selbstschutz, a paramilitary formation of civilian shooters composed of men from the German minority of pre-war Poland, as well as the Einsatzkommando 16 of SS Einsatzgruppen under command of SS-Sturmbannführer dr Rudolf Tröger. Between September 1939 and April 1940 Selbstschutz - together with other Nazi-German formations - murdered tens of thousands of Poles in Pomerania.

Established investigations point to Ludolf von Alvensleben and Jakub Löllgen, as the main organizers of the mass murder. Other Germans involved in the crime were: Sturmbannführers Erich Spaarmann, Meier, Schnugg, SS-Sturmbannführer dr Rudolf Tröger, SS man Baks, and a number of Volksdeutsche including Wilhelm Neumann, Herbert Beitsch, Otto Erlichmann (Nazi mayor of Fordon), and Walter Gassmann.

Other Nazi German mass murder sites in Bydgoszcz area are the villages of Tryszczyn and Borówno.

See also

 Anti-Polonism
 List of Polish Martyrdom sites

Notes and references

History of Fordon 1939-1945  
Extermination of Polish intelligentsia on Pomerania  
Valley of Death - pictures and short description

Bibliography
Jochen Böhler, Klaus-Michael Mallmann, Jürgen Matthäus: Einsatzgruppen in Polen. Warszawa: Bellona, 2009. 

1939 in Poland
Einsatzgruppen
Massacres in Poland
Valleys of Poland
Nazi war crimes in Poland
Holocaust massacres and pogroms in Poland
Mass murder in 1939
Reichsgau Danzig-West Prussia
Bydgoszcz